Scalicus paucibarbatus s a species of marine ray-finned fish belonging to the family Peristediidae, the armoured gurnards or armored sea robins. This species is found in Indian Ocean and western Pacific Ocean.

References 

paucibarbatus
Animals described in 2019